The fifth season of iCarly began airing on Nickelodeon on August 13, 2011, and finished its run on January 21, 2012. 

This season features Carly Shay (Miranda Cosgrove), Sam Puckett (Jennette McCurdy), Freddie Benson (Nathan Kress) and Gibby Gibson (Noah Munck) as their web show, iCarly, is becoming more popular worldwide, with Sam and Freddie now as a confirmed couple, until the episode, "iLove You".

Jerry Trainor co-stars as Carly's older brother Spencer, and Noah Munck co-stars as Gibby. This season had the specials "iLost My Mind", "iDate Sam & Freddie", "iBloop 2: Electric Bloopaloo", "iStill Psycho, and "iMeet the First Lady".

Season synopsis
Following the events of "iOMG", Sam checks herself into a mental hospital, unable to handle her mixed feelings towards Freddie. During an iCarly webcast live from the institution, Freddie and Sam share a kiss, symbolizing the start of a new relationship.

In the next few episodes ("iDate Sam & Freddie", "iCan't Take It", and "iLove You"), Sam and Freddie continue their relationship. In "iDate Sam & Freddie", Freddie and Sam are constantly arguing, and enlist the help of Carly to resolve all their fights. By the end of the episode, Carly is fed up and tells them to simply break up if all they do is fight. In "iCan't Take It," Freddie and Sam have stopped arguing, but their relationship proves to create problems for those around him. Gibby, indignant at Sam now directing her violent tendencies towards him now that she is dating her previous target, devises a plan to break them up with the help of Freddie's disapproving mother. This plan nearly works but Carly eventually convinces them to make up. In "iLove You," Freddie and Sam's relationship comes to an official end after they realize they have little to nothing in common with each other, though not before they profess their love for one another and suggest that they may rekindle their relationship.

After the first few episodes of this season, T-Bo moves into Freddie and Mrs. Benson's apartment in Bushwell Plaza after being evicted from The Groovy Smoothie. Sam and Freddie help him do this by disguising him as a respectful gentleman. This initially works, but Mrs. Benson later evicts him upon discovering his true personality, though she later has a change of heart and decides to let him stay after he rescues the gang from an obsessed fan.

Development
In late January 2011, while doing press for her North American Dancing Crazy concert tour, Miranda Cosgrove began telling news sources that she was looking forward to returning to Hollywood to begin filming a 5th season of iCarly. On January 27, 2011, Cosgrove told Cleveland Live News "We're getting ready to start the next season, right after the tour. I would be willing to do the show as long as people like it and as long as it works." On January 28, 2011, Reuters news agency also reported that Cosgrove was preparing to begin filming a 5th season of iCarly, and on February 3, 2011 Cosgrove told The Middletown Press, when speaking of the show and her co-stars Jennette McCurdy and Nathan Kress, "I've known them since I was little. I can't wait to get back. I'm really comfortable doing iCarly. It's like my home away from home." Cosgrove concluded her Dancing Crazy concert tour on February 24, 2011, and Jennette McCurdy finished her Generation Love mall tour on April 14, 2011. The entire cast did not even get together until the 2011 Kids' Choice Awards. Miranda Cosgrove recently confirmed that filming would resume shortly. At the 2011 Kids' Choice Awards, Jerry Trainor stated that filming would resume in May.

Cast

Main cast

 Miranda Cosgrove as Carly Shay
 Jennette McCurdy as Sam Puckett
 Nathan Kress as Freddie Benson
 Jerry Trainor as Spencer Shay
 Noah Munck as Gibby Gibson

Recurring cast

 BooG!e as T-Bo
 Mary Scheer as Marissa Benson
 Danielle Morrow as Nora Dershlit

Guest stars
 Jim Parsons as Caleb ("iLost My Mind")
 Taran Killam as Secret Service Agent ("iMeet The First Lady")
 Michelle Obama as herself ("iMeet The First Lady")

Episodes

References

2011 American television seasons
2012 American television seasons
5